Catasetum pileatum, the felt-capped catasetum or mother of pearl flower, is a species of orchid found from Trinidad to Ecuador.

References

External links

pileatum
Orchids of Ecuador
Orchids of Trinidad